William John Grassie (born May 3, 1957) is an activist for numerous causes, including nonviolence and a freeze on nuclear weapons, reform of science education, and greater dialogue between science and religion.  He is the executive director of Metanexus Institute, an organization which worked closely with the John Templeton Foundation to promote "dialogue and interactive syntheses between religion and the sciences internationally."

Early years
Grassie was born in Wilmington, Delaware and attended Middlebury College. He is member of the Quakers.

Social activism
In 1980 in Philadelphia, he promoted nuclear disarmament via the Friends Peace Committee, where he helped to found the Nuclear Weapons Freeze Campaign.

Grassie was arrested in several non-violent civil disobedience actions and was a symbolic war tax resister. Grassie and David Falls, another employee of the Religious Society of Friends, a Quaker organization, refused to pay federal taxes on the grounds that it would support nuclear war, but a judge ruled, in a civil suit by the IRS in 1990, that the church was obliged to enforce levies against the salaries of the two employees. A statement by the Friends Quaker religious organization followed:

In 1987 and 1988, Grassie worked as a community organizer in Southwest Germantown, Philadelphia, and organized the "Three Hundred Anniversary Celebration of the Germantown Protest Against Slavery" in commemoration of the first European protest against slavery in the New World (1688). The project was designed as a community development initiative and helped catalyze a community revitalization project now known as "Freedom Square".<ref>Jan Gehorsan, Associated Press, March 15, 1998, Ill-Fated Anti-Slavery Document Focus of Week's Activities, Accessed Aug. 27, 2013, quote=You could call it a failure, since slavery continued for nearly two more centuries, said the event's coordinator, William Grassie.</ref>

 Academia 
Grassie earned a Ph.D. in comparative religion from Temple University in 1994, and served as an assistant professor in its Intellectual Heritage Program.

 Metanexus 
The Philadelphia Center for Religions and Science was founded in 1998, and it changed its name in 2000 to the "Metanexus Institute on Religion and Science" to reflect its international reach. In 2011 the organization shortened its name to simply Metanexus Institute and is now based in New York City. The organization originally promoted dialog between religion and science, but now "promotes scientifically rigorous and philosophically open-ended explorations of foundational questions" through engagement with Big History.

See also
 List of peace activists

 Books 
 Applied Big History: A Guide for Entrepreneurs, Investors, and Other Living Things, Mexanexus Imprints, 2018.
 The New Sciences of Religion: Exploring Spirituality from the Outside In and Bottom Up, New York: Palgrave Macmillan, 2010.
 Politics by Other Means: Science and Religion in the 21st Century, Philadelphia: Metanexus, 2010.H+/-: Transhumanism and Its Critics, Philadelphia: Metanexus, 2011 (edited with Gregory Hansell).
 Advanced Methodologies in the Scientific Study of Religious and Spiritual Phenomena'', Philadelphia: Metanexus 2010 (edited).

References 

American theologians
Living people
1957 births
Temple University alumni
Activists from Philadelphia
People from Wilmington, Delaware